Lost Prince may refer to:
 The Lost Prince (Burnett novel), 1915 British-American children's Ruritanian adventure
 "The Lost Prince", 1985 Star Wars: Droids episode
 The Lost Prince, 2003 British television drama about Prince John, son of King George V
 The Lost Prince (Edwards novel), 2012 American historical time travel fantasy

See also
 The Little Prince (Lost), 2009 fifth season episode of fantasy adventure TV series Lost